Richard Amondo Annan (born 4 December 1968) is an English former professional footballer who played in the Football League as a left back.

References

1968 births
Living people
English footballers
Association football defenders
Leeds United F.C. players
Doncaster Rovers F.C. players
Guiseley A.F.C. players
Crewe Alexandra F.C. players
Halifax Town A.F.C. players
Morecambe F.C. players
Hyde United F.C. players
Farsley Celtic A.F.C. players
English Football League players
National League (English football) players